Shree Siddharoodha Swamiji Hubballi Junction, commonly known as SSS Hubballi Junction or simply Hubli Junction (Station code: UBL), is a railway junction station under Hubli railway division of South Western Railway zone (SWR) of Indian Railways situated in Hubli, Karnataka, India. The platform number 1 of Hubli Junction has a length of 1,507 metres, making it the longest railway platform in the world as of March 2023.

SSS Hubballi Junction Railway Station has one of the best infrastructural terminal and has three entrances to get into station. One is the main entrance, other infront of Central Railway Hospital of Gadag road, and third one few metres ahead of main entrance i.e near yard. The station has interesting Platform bifurcation.It has total 8 platforms, five of them are alike other stations i.e one beside the another & other three in the next entry. The longest platform is divided into two parts, it has platform no 1 & 8 on same platform.

Description 
Hubli Junction is center place for transportation of public and commercial in Karnataka by connecting northwest to Mumbai, west to Goa, South to Bengaluru and east to Hyderabad with heavy mass transportation.

It is the busiest railway station in Karnataka after Bengaluru City. The Hubli division situated in Hubli city connects Bengaluru, Mysuru, Mangaluru, Hyderabad, Mumbai, New Delhi, Chennai, Thiruvananthapuram, Goa and more.

Commercial goods such as manganese are the main source of income, with public transport being secondary. Currently, Hubli Junction is undergoing remodeling work on platform number 1.

The Hubballi Junction (under Hubballi Division) has Goods Shed, Diesel Loco Shed, Carriage Repair Workshop, Train Yard, and many more of Railways. The railways make a pride for the people of Hubballi. The station was opened in the late 19th century i.e 1886-87 by the British Company. It was a major important station for both passengers as well as goods from the old era itself. It has maor importance in the South Western Railway jurisdiction. It has connection to almost every part of India (Bengaluru, Chennai, Trivandrum, Mumbai, Pune, Ahmedabad, Udaipur, New Delhi, Varanasi, Kolkata, Hyderabad, Vishakapatnam, Madgaon-Vasco-Goa and many more. The station is the second busiest in the zone after Bengaluru at first.

Lines 
The Madras and Southern Mahratta Railway opened the  Hubli–Harihar rail line on 18 October 1886. And Hubli–Londa, Hospet–Hubli and Chikjajur–Hubli (part of  Bangalore–Hubli) rail lines were converted during 1995.

Diesel Loco Shed
Diesel Loco Shed, Hubli which is under South Western Railways (SWR), currently homes EMD locomotives of Class WDP-4, WDP-4D, WDG-4, WDG-4D and class WAG-9HC electric locomotives.

References

External links
All about Hubli Railway Station
Hubli Railway Station Contact Numbers

Railway junction stations in Karnataka
Hubli railway division
Railway stations in Dharwad district
Railway stations in India opened in 1886
Transport in Hubli-Dharwad
Buildings and structures in Hubli-Dharwad
1886 establishments in India